(in Marshallese pronounced ), also called the Kabua Party, is a political party in the Marshall Islands, headed by David Kabua. It is a coalition of other parties, including the United People's Party led by former president Litokwa Tomeing. The party is led by traditional chiefs, the Iroij. At the last legislative elections, 17 November 2003, no parties participated, though part of the members could be members of either  or the United Democratic Party.

References 

Political parties in the Marshall Islands